The flag of French Polynesia is the civil and state flag of the French overseas country French Polynesia. It was adopted in 1984. According to the articles of adoption, the flag of French Polynesia must be displayed with the French tricolor, and may be displayed with the flags of the component archipelagos. The French Polynesian flag must be displayed to the left of the French flag, and the flag of the archipelago must be displayed to its right.

Description
Two red horizontal bands encase a wide white band in a 1:2:1 ratio; centered on the white band is the coat of arms of French Polynesia as a 0.43m diameter disk with a blue and white wave pattern depicting the sea on the lower half and a gold and white ray pattern depicting the sun on the upper half; a Polynesian canoe rides on the wave pattern; the canoe has a crew of five represented by five stars that symbolize the five island groups; red and white are traditional Polynesian colors.

Flags of component archipelagos

Flags of the Society Islands

Leeward Islands

Windward Islands

Flags of the Tuamotu Archipelago

Flags of the Austral Islands

See also
Flag of France
Coat of arms of French Polynesia
Gallery of Polynesian flags

References

External links

Flag
French Polynesia
Flags of French Polynesia
French